Emilio Audero Mulyadi (born 18 January 1997) is a professional footballer who plays as a goalkeeper for Serie A club Sampdoria.

Born in Indonesia, Audero is a former youth international player for Italy, reaching the under-21 level. He is eligible to play for both Italy and Indonesia internationally.

Early life
Audero was born in Mataram, Indonesia to an Indonesian father Edy Mulyadi and Italian mother Antonella Audero. He moved with his family to his mother's hometown in Cumiana, Italy in 1998.

Club career

Juventus

Youth
Audero joined the Juventus youth system in 2008, at age 11, after being noticed by Michelangelo Rampulla. With the Primavera (under-19) side, he reached the final of the 2015–16 Campionato Nazionale Primavera under manager Fabio Grosso, only to lose out 7–6 on penalties to Roma, following a 1–1 draw.

Senior
Audero was first called up to the Juventus first team by manager Massimiliano Allegri on 30 November 2014, but remained on the bench in Juventus's 2–1 home win over cross-city rivals Torino; he was called up to the bench five more times throughout the 2014–15 season. The following season, he signed his first professional contract with the club once he turned 18, and was even included in the team's UEFA list; he was called up to the first team on 18 occasions in total, but once again failed to make an appearance for the club.

Following the departure of Rubinho in 2016, Audero was promoted to the club's third-choice goalkeeper behind Gianluigi Buffon and Neto for the 2016–17 season. After 61 call-ups in the league, Audero made his professional debut with Juventus on 27 May 2017, at the age of 20, in the final match of the 2016–17 Serie A season, a 2–1 away victory over Bologna.

Loan to Venezia
On 8 July 2017, Audero joined Serie B club Venezia on loan.

Sampdoria
On 17 July 2018, Audero signed for Serie A club Sampdoria on loan until 30 June 2019 with an option to buy. On 26 February 2019, Sampdoria signed Audero on a permanent transfer in a deal worth €20 million.

International career
As he was born in Indonesia to an Indonesian father and an Italian mother, Audero remains eligible to play for both the Italy and Indonesia senior national teams.

Since 2012, he has represented Italy at all youth levels from the under-15 to under-21 levels. With the Italy U17 team he took part at the 2013 UEFA European Under-17 Championship. He was left out of the Italy under-20 squad for the 2017 FIFA U-20 World Cup in South Korea as Juventus wanted him to remain eligible to play for the club. On 4 September 2017, he made his debut with the Italy U21 team under Luigi Di Biagio in a 4–1 friendly victory against Slovenia in Cittadella.

Style of play
A tall goalkeeper, Audero possesses a good physique, and is known for his determination, reflexes, and shot-stopping ability between the posts, as well as his speed when rushing off his line and ability to get to ground and collect the ball, which enables his team to keep a high defensive line and inspire a sense of confidence in his back-line; he is less adept with his feet however. Considered to be a talented young player in the media, in 2019 UEFA included him in their list of the most promising European players of his generation.

Career statistics

Club

Honours
Juventus
 Serie A: 2016–17
 Coppa Italia: 2016–17

Italy U17 
 UEFA European Under-17 Championship runner-up: 2013

References

External links
 
 
 
 Juventus profile

Living people
1997 births
Sportspeople from West Nusa Tenggara
Italian people of Indonesian descent
Indonesian people of Italian descent
Italian footballers
Indonesian footballers
Association football goalkeepers
Juventus F.C. players
Venezia F.C. players
U.C. Sampdoria players
Serie A players
Serie B players
Italy youth international footballers
Italy under-21 international footballers